The Big Five is an informal institution of California state government, consisting of the governor, the Assembly speaker, the Assembly minority leader, the Senate president pro tempore, and the Senate minority leader. Members of the Big Five meet in private to negotiate California's state government budget. Because the party caucus leaders in California's legislature also control the party's legislative campaign funds and the majority party leaders control legislative committee and office assignments, the leaders wield tremendous power over their caucus members. They are thus usually able to guarantee their caucus's votes in Big Five meetings. Therefore, if all five members agree to a budget, it will likely pass into law.

Current members
Governor: Gavin Newsom (Democrat)
Assembly Speaker: Anthony Rendon (Democrat)
Assembly Minority Leader: James Gallagher (Republican)
Senate President pro tempore: Toni Atkins (Democrat)
Senate Minority Leader: Scott Wilk (Republican)

GOP 5
During budget talks in 2011, five Republican state senators broke with their party and were willing to negotiate with Governor Jerry Brown about placing propositions on the ballot to extend tax increases. The five senators, known as the "GOP 5" as a tribute to the "big 5", were: Tom Berryhill, Sam Blakeslee, Anthony Cannella, Bill Emmerson, and Tom Harman.

References

Politics of California